Gyöngyösi Atlétikai Klub is a professional football club based in Gyöngyös, Heves County, Hungary, that competes in the Nemzeti Bajnokság III, the third tier of Hungarian football.

History
Gyöngyös is going to compete in the 2017–18 Nemzeti Bajnokság III.

Honours

Domestic
Heves I:
Winner (1): 2016–17

Season results
As of 6 August 2017

External links
 Profile on Magyar Futball

References

Football clubs in Hungary
Association football clubs established in 1906
1906 establishments in Hungary